Primitive Baptist Church (The College Street Primitive Baptist Church) is a historic Primitive Baptist church at 627-629 3rd Ave., S. in Nashville, Tennessee.

It was built in 1850 and added to the National Register in 1984.

The building is the current home of The Anchor Fellowship, an interdenominational Christian community. It also serves as a music and events venue.

References

Baptist churches in Tennessee
Churches on the National Register of Historic Places in Tennessee
Gothic Revival church buildings in Tennessee
Churches completed in 1850
19th-century Baptist churches in the United States
Churches in Nashville, Tennessee
National Register of Historic Places in Nashville, Tennessee
Primitive Baptists